Purús Province is one of four provinces in the Ucayali Region, in the central Amazon rainforest of Peru.  The Purus River runs through it.

The province is conformed by a single district, Purús District, whose capital is Esperanza. The district is headed by an ( (mayor).

Languages 
According to the 2007 census, Spanish was spoken by 30.2% of the population as their first language, while 2.3% spoke Asháninka, 0.6% spoke Quechua, 0.2% spoke Aymara, 66.2% spoke other indigenous languages and 0.4% spoke foreign languages.

Provinces of the Ucayali Region